Eintracht Braunschweig is a German professional football club based in Braunschweig, Lower Saxony. The club was founded in 1895.

List of players

 Appearances and goals are for first-team competitive matches only. Included are all games in domestic leagues (including championship and promotion/relegation play-offs) and the German Cup (DFB-Pokal) from the 1947–48 season up to the most recent completed season, the European Cup, and the UEFA Cup. Domestic league and cup games before 1947 are not included due to incomplete records, although players who have only made confirmed appearances before 1947 are still listed if they have their own Wikipedia article.

List of international players

This is a list of past and present football players who were capped by their country whilst playing for Eintracht Braunschweig.

 Caps: Number of games for the senior national team whilst playing for Eintracht Braunschweig.
 Goals: Number of goals for the senior national team whilst playing for Eintracht Braunschweig.
 OLY C: Number of games for the national Olympic team whilst playing for Eintracht Braunschweig (final tournament only).
 OLY G: Number of goals for the national Olympic team whilst playing for Eintracht Braunschweig (final tournament only).
 U-21 C: Number of games for the national under-21 team whilst playing for Eintracht Braunschweig.
 U-21 G: Number of goals for the national under-21 team whilst playing for Eintracht Braunschweig.
 U-23 C: Number of games for the national under-23 team whilst playing for Eintracht Braunschweig.
 U-23 G: Number of goals for the national under-23 team whilst playing for Eintracht Braunschweig.
 B-NT C: Number of games for the national B team whilst playing for Eintracht Braunschweig.
 B-NT G: Number of goals for the national B team whilst playing for Eintracht Braunschweig.

Eintracht Braunschweig players at international tournaments

FIFA World Cup 

 Ermin Bičakčić: 2014
 Hasse Borg: 1978
 Daniel Davari: 2014
 Bernd Franke: 1982 
 Max Lorenz: 1970 
 Horst Wolter: 1970

UEFA European Football Championship 

 Danilo Popivoda: 1976

Africa Cup of Nations 

 Michél Mazingu-Dinzey: 2004

CONCACAF Gold Cup 

 Simeon Jackson: 2013

Olympic Games 

 Serge Branco: 2000 
 Bernd Franke: 1984
 Friedhelm Haebermann: 1972
 Peter Lux: 1984

UEFA European Under-21 Football Championship 

 Emil Berggreen: 2015
 Omar Elabdellaoui: 2013
 Michael Geiger: 1982

Sources 

 Eintracht Braunschweig at Fußballdaten.de (in German)
 Eintracht Braunschweig at Weltfußball.de (in German)
 Eintracht Braunschweig at Eu-football.info
 
 
 
 
 

 
Eintracht Braunschweig
Association football player non-biographical articles